The Appleby logboat is a Bronze Age logboat, found during dredging of the old River Acholme near Appleby, North Lincolnshire, England in 1943. It dates to the period 1500–1300 BC. It is one of two prehistoric dug-out boat found in the Ancholme, the other being found near Brigg in 1886. Both of these boats contain evidence of repairs in the form of sewing of lashing techniques: splits in the wood had been repaired using birch (Betula sp.) plants held in place by oak (Quercus sp.) wedges.

The boat is on public display at North Lincolnshire Museum.

See also
Fiskerton log boat

References

1943 in England
1943 archaeological discoveries
Archaeological sites in Lincolnshire
Bronze Age Britain
Ancient boats
Collections of North Lincolnshire Museum